Duiwenhoks River, located in Western Cape, South Africa, drains the Langeberg Mountains and flows south to the coast, entering the sea west of Mossel Bay in the Southern Cape. The river is approximately 83 km long with a catchment area of 1 340 km2. The Noukrans River is a tributary.

The Duiwenhoks Dam is situated in this river.

See also
 List of reservoirs and dams in South Africa
 List of rivers of South Africa
 Vermaaklikheid

References 
 List of South African Dams from the Department of Water Affairs and Forestry (South Africa)

Rivers of the Western Cape